was a railway station in the city of Ōmachi, Nagano, Japan, operated by East Japan Railway Company (JR East).  This station was a seasonal station, which was open from December to March. The station closed permanently on 16 March 2019

Lines 
Yanaba Skiing Ground Station was served by the Ōito Line and was 47.9 kilometers from the terminus of the line at Matsumoto Station.

Station layout 
The station consisted of one ground-level side platform. The station was unattended.

History 
Yanaba Skiing Ground  Station opened on 24 December 1985. With the privatization of Japanese National Railways (JNR) on 1 April 1987, the station came under the control of JR East.

Surrounding area 
Yanaba Skiing Ground

See also
 List of railway stations in Japan

References

External links 

 JR East station information 

Railway stations in Nagano Prefecture
Stations of East Japan Railway Company
Ōito Line
Railway stations in Japan opened in 1985
Ōmachi, Nagano